Miratesta celebensis is a species of freshwater air-breathing snails, aquatic pulmonate gastropod mollusks in the family Planorbidae, the ram's horn snails, or planorbids. Like all other planorbids it has a sinistral or left-coiling shell.

This species is endemic to Indonesia. Its natural habitat is freshwater lakes.

References

Planorbidae
Gastropods described in 1898
Taxonomy articles created by Polbot